Advanced Fashion Design and Technology is a fashion-related manufacturing process that integrates new technologies.

AFD
Advanced Fashion Design refers to both the design and the manufacturing processes. The inclusion of both processes allows for this technology to be classified as "advanced." It utilizes Computer-aided design (CAD) to pattern-make and design. The first CAD package for clothing came out in 1985 and helped to significantly decrease inefficiencies in making and readjusting panel patterns. Since 1985, software packages containing computer clothing design have made tremendous advancements. Listed below are the functions of the CAD package:

Main functions
Draping
Pattern grading
Fashion illustration
Fashion trends and Fashion forecasting
Trade sketching
Embellishing garments
Using electronic fashion design tools
Interacting/networking with the fashion design industry
Quality assurance

Tech Design
Another way that technology has contributed to the fashion industry is in the manufacturing process. Many garments today are produced through outsourcing to other countries. Tech Packs are one way to efficiently and effectively produce these products. Tech Packs contain 9 pages of information that help the manufacturer communicate with the designer. Listed below is the order of the pages:

A summary page with a drawn example of the garment 
Usually using Adobe Illustrator
Construction details 
In-depth details of different pieces to the garment
Dimensions 
In-depth measurements of a garment
Order of Operation 
In this case, the order of operations is the order of construction
Component 
The component section is a list of the different pieces/trims involved
Cost Section 
Cost and quantity of materials
Label Section 
Includes illustrations and descriptions of tags/labels on the garment
Shipping 
The manner in which the product is packaged and shipped
History 
In this case, refers to any changes prior to finishing

Designing Software
Many organizations have started offering customization software including apparel design, suit design, t-shirt customization, and much more. This software eases the work of fashion designers and apparel manufacturers.

Databases
The fashion industry has been using databases to aggregate and organize information specific to the industry.  Below are some examples of such databases:

1. Mix-and-Match databases

The mix-and-match database is a database used in Hong Kong.  Traditionally, fashion companies depend on sales associates to make complementary clothing recommendations for customers.  The mix-and-match database essentially does the same thing but in a different way.  In order to use this database, all clothes in the store have to be tagged with a radio frequency identification (RFID) tag.  In addition, each fitting room has to be equipped with a computer monitor.  When a customer brings a clothing item with an RFID tag into the fitting room, the computer monitor will identify the garment, and display photographs of complementary items using the database.>

2. Fashion Library databases

An example of a useful Fashion Library database is the National Institute of Fashion Technology's Virtual Fashion Library (VFL) in India. This database is specifically organized to meet the needs of India's fashion designers. The VFL's most useful tool is its Fashion Image Inventory.  The inventory includes three image banks: the Indian fashion museum, the virtual swatch library, and archives of fashion shows.  The Indian fashion museum contains pictures and videos of Indian costumes and dress throughout various historical periods. The virtual swatch library includes a collection of fabrics from all over India which helps designers select fabrics and patterns made in India.  The archives fashion show contains videos of India's top fashion runway shows.

References

Course listing by Australian Institute of Fashion Design
Wong, W.K., et al. “A fashion mix-and-match expert system for fashion retailers using fuzzy screening approach.” Science Direct. 2009:1750-1763. Inspec. University of Michigan Libraries, Ann Arbor, MI. March 26, 2009.
Kumar, Sanjeev, and Nandini Dutta. “Designing a National Fashion Information System: A perspective plan.” The International Information & Library Review. 2006:43-44. Inspec. University of Michigan Libraries, Ann Arbor, MI. March 26, 2009.
Walter, and White. Technical Design Emersion Text. Print.

Fashion design